Sam Deering (born 26 February 1991) is an English footballer who plays as a midfielder for Bishop's Stortford.

Playing career
Deering spent time as a youth team player with Chelsea and Charlton Athletic before joining Oxford United's academy in 2006.

He was promoted to the first team in 2008 and went on to make his first team debut against Weymouth on 12 August of that year. Deering scored twice in December 2008 before breaking his leg against Salisbury City. He was fined and warned about his future conduct later that week after making racist comments on a social networking website. In a club statement, the Oxford United chairman Kelvin Thomas said: "We take this issue very seriously. I have spoken to Sam personally and he has been made aware that we will not tolerate such comments." Thomas added: "Knowing Sam and his background I am confident he is not a racist. He must understand he is a role model and even his throwaway comments have an impact on people's lives."

Upon returning to action in September 2009, Deering joined Newport County on loan for a month, making four league appearances during his stay with the club.

He made his first appearance for Oxford in ten months against Altrincham on 31 October, and scored his first goal of the 2009–10 season against Histon on 13 February 2010. Deering signed a new contract in March 2010, and helped the club win promotion back to the Football League in the 2010 Conference play-off Final at Wembley Stadium, most notably by setting up the final and third goal.

In November 2010, he rejoined Newport County on loan. He returned to Oxford on 4 January 2011, having made three appearances whilst on loan. In February 2011, he was loaned to Barnet for the remainder of the season, where he helped them avoid relegation. The move was made permanent at the end of the season.

Deering joined Cheltenham Town on 5 July 2012, spending two years at Whaddon Road before moving to Conference South side Whitehawk in 2014. Deering was named in the Conference South team of the season for 2014–15 alongside teammates Nick Arnold and Lee Hills.

Shortly after Steve King's departure as manager at Whitehawk, with his contract due to expire at the end of the season, Deering joined Ebbsfleet United for an undisclosed fee in March 2016. Deering joined Billericay Town for the 2017–18 season.

On 14 November 2019, he went back full-time when he signed for National League side Dagenham & Redbridge on a two-year deal. He was released by Dagenham along with five others in June 2021 following the expiration of his contract.

Deering joined Farnborough in July 2021. He went on to win the 2021–22 Southern League Playoffs with Farnborough, scoring the winner in the 86th minute to make it 2–1 against Hayes & Yeading United in the playoff final, earning Farnborough promotion to the National League South. 

On 2 February 2023, Deering signed for Bishop's Stortford.

Career statistics

References

External links

1991 births
Footballers from Stepney
Living people
English footballers
England semi-pro international footballers
Association football midfielders
Oxford United F.C. players
Newport County A.F.C. players
Barnet F.C. players
Cheltenham Town F.C. players
Whitehawk F.C. players
Ebbsfleet United F.C. players
Billericay Town F.C. players
Dagenham & Redbridge F.C. players
Farnborough F.C. players
Bishop's Stortford F.C. players
English Football League players
National League (English football) players
Isthmian League players